Outside of Japan, an uwagi (上着/上衣) means a kimono-like jacket worn in Japan. It is believed as most familiar as the top half of a martial arts uniform.

The third element, the obi, ties the uwagi closed.

In some martial arts, the set is completed with hakama, which might be worn over, or instead of the zubon.

In the common and modern use of Japanese language, however, "uwagi" just means an outerwear or tops.

See also 

Keikogi
Shitagi

External links
 "How to Fold Uwagi and Hakama"

Japanese upper-body garments
Japanese martial arts equipment